Primula denticulata, the drumstick primula, is a species of flowering plant in the family Primulaceae, native to moist alpine regions of China (S Xizang), Afghanistan, Bhutan, India, Kashmir, N Myanmar, Nepal, and Pakistan. Flowers can also be lavender, pink, or white in colour.

The specific epithet denticulata means "small-toothed", referring to the serrated leaf edges.
The plant's common name, drumstick primula, refers to the spherical shape of the inflorescence, above an erect stem. 

A popular garden subject for deep moist soil in sun or partial shade, P. denticulata and its cultivars can be grown from seed. It has gained the Royal Horticultural Society's Award of Garden Merit.

Toxicity
Primula denticulata is known to contain the contact allergens primin and other quinoid compounds.

References

Flora of China
Flora of Afghanistan
Flora of Myanmar
Flora of the Indian subcontinent
Flora of Tibet
denticulata